Łucki is a Polish-language toponymic surname literally meaning "from/of Łuck". Notable people with this surname include:

Simḥah Isaac Luzki (1716-1766), qaraim maskil, theologian, kabbalist writer, scholar, bibliographer and spiritual leader
Brenda Lucki, first female police commissioner for the Royal Canadian Mounted Police
George Lucki (born 1957), Polish-Canadian consulting psychologist 
Jerzy Michał Łucki (1898 –  1939), Polish bobsledder, military officer and athlete

Polish-language surnames
Toponymic surnames